PTT may refer to:

Chemistry and medicine
 Partial thromboplastin time, a performance indicator in medicine for coagulation status
 Photothermal Therapy, a medical treatment
 2β-propanoyl-3β-(4-tolyl)-tropane, a cocaine analogue
 Polytrimethylene terephthalate, polyester
 Pulse Transit Time, a measure of arterial blood pressure

Communication and technology
 Postal Telephone and Telegraph, a government agency in many countries
 Posterijen, Telegrafie en Telefonie (Netherlands) (formerly a government agency)
 Postes, télégraphes et téléphones (France)
 Postes, télégraphes, téléphones (Switzerland)
 Posta Telgraf Teşkilatı (Turkey)
 PTT Bulletin Board System, the largest bulletin board system in Taiwan
 Pneumatic tube, Pneumatic tube transport
 Push to talk, or "Press-to-Transmit", a method of conversing on half-duplex communication lines
 Pass-the-ticket
 Platform Trust Technology, a firmware-based Trusted Platform Module (TPM) which is part of Intel Management Engine

Organizations
 PTT Public Company Limited, a Thai oil and gas company
 Pashtun Tahafuz Movement (PTM), also known as the Pashtun Tahafuz Tehrik (PTT), a human rights movement in Pakistan for the Pashtun people
 Pennsylvania Tunnel and Terminal Railroad, the owner of the tunnels to New York Penn Station
 Police Tactical Team, now Singapore Police Force's Special Tactics and Rescue unit
 Prince's Trust Team, a development programme for teenagers by partners of the Prince's Trust throughout the UK

Sport
 Port Talbot Town F.C., a Welsh Premier League football association club

Other
 Petronas Twin Towers in Kuala Lumpur, Malaysia 
 Photothermal time, related to plant growth
 Pizza Time Theatre, former secondary name for Chuck E. Cheese's
 Pull Tiger Tail, a British indie band
 PTT (Paint the Town), a 2021 single by Loona